Brown Ridge is a bare rock ridge,  long, extending north-northwest from Nelson Peak in the Neptune Range of the Pensacola Mountains. It was mapped by the United States Geological Survey from surveys and from U.S. Navy air photos, 1955–66, and named by the Advisory Committee on Antarctic Names for Robert D. Brown, a geologist with the Patuxent Range field party, 1962–63.

References 

Ridges of Queen Elizabeth Land